José Muguerza Anitua (born 15 September 1911 in Eibar; died 23 October 1980 in Mexico) was a footballer from the Basque Country in northern Spain, who played as a midfielder.

Football career
He began his career at Unión Deportiva Eibarresa in 1927 before moving in 1929 to Athletic Bilbao where he stayed until 1937, winning La Liga and the Copa del Rey four times each. In the 1938-39 season he played for Club Deportivo Euzkadi in the Primera Fuerza league in Mexico, after which he joined Club España also in Mexico.

From 1952-1953 he was the trainer for Club de Fútbol Monterrey.

International football
Muguerza earned 9 caps for the Spain national team between 1930 and 1936, including participating in the 1934 FIFA World Cup. In 1937, during the Spanish Civil War, he was selected for the Basque national team tour of Europe, which was undertaken to draw attention to the war in Spain. When the Basque Country was captured by fascist forces the team travelled to the Americas where they continued their tour, playing the tour's final match in June 1939.  In total Muguerza played 43 games for the Basque national team.

Other work
In 1949 he opened a shop selling shirts in Mexico City.

Personal life
He married Rosario Juaristi and had two children, José Miguel and Rosario.

Awards
Spanish Cup (4): 1930, 1931, 1932, 1933
La Liga (4): 1930, 1931, 1934, 1936

References

External links

Profile

1911 births
1980 deaths
Spanish footballers
Spain international footballers
1934 FIFA World Cup players
Athletic Bilbao footballers
Footballers from Eibar
Association football midfielders
Spanish expatriate footballers
Expatriate footballers in Mexico
Spanish expatriate sportspeople in Mexico
Spanish emigrants to Mexico
Exiles of the Spanish Civil War in Mexico
Liga MX players
Real Club España footballers
SD Eibar footballers
La Liga players
Basque Country international footballers